Lithium bis(trifluoromethanesulfonyl)imide, often simply referred to as LiTFSI, is a hydrophilic salt with the chemical formula LiC2F6NO4S2. It is commonly used as Li-ion source in electrolytes for Li-ion batteries as a safer alternative to commonly used lithium hexafluorophosphate. It is made up of one Li cation and a bistriflimide anion.

Because of its very high solubility in water (> 21 m), LiTFSI has been used as lithium salt in water-in-salt electrolytes for aqueous lithium-ion batteries.

References 

Lithium salts
Lithium-ion batteries
Organolithium compounds
Trifluoromethyl compounds